Potadoma is a genus of gastropods belonging to the family Pachychilidae. 

The species of this genus are found in Africa and Caribbean.

Species:
Potadoma alutacea 
Potadoma angulata 
Potadoma bicarinata 
Potadoma bifidicincta 
Potadoma brevissima 
Potadoma buttikoferi 
Potadoma emerenciae 
Potadoma freethi 
Potadoma graptoconus 
Potadoma ignobilis 
Potadoma kadeii 
Potadoma kanyatsiae 
Potadoma kyeoroensis 
Potadoma liberiensis 
Potadoma liricincta 
Potadoma lomekwiensis 
Potadoma moerchi 
Potadoma mupandae 
Potadoma nageli 
Potadoma nyakabingoensis 
Potadoma nyongensis 
Potadoma olivoidea 
Potadoma plicata 
Potadoma ponthiervillensis 
Potadoma rahmi 
Potadoma riperti 
Potadoma schoutedeni 
Potadoma sebugoroensis 
Potadoma sengae 
Potadoma spinifera 
Potadoma togoensis 
Potadoma trochiformis 
Potadoma undulosa 
Potadoma unicincta 
Potadoma vogelii 
Potadoma wansoni 
Potadoma zenkeri 
Synonyms
 Potadoma agglutinans Bequaert & Clench, 1941: synonym of Melanoides agglutinans (Bequaert & Clench, 1941) (original combination)
 Potadoma bequaerti E. Binder, 1963: synonym of Potadoma liberiensis (Schepman, 1888)
 Potadoma ganahli Connolly, 1930 †: synonym of Neothauma ganahli (Connolly, 1930) † (new combination)
 Potadoma medjeorum Pilsbry & Bequaert, 1927: synonym of Potadoma liricincta (E. A. Smith, 1888)
 Potadoma mungwana Pilsbry & Bequaert, 1927: synonym of Potadoma ignobilis (Thiele, 1911) (junior synonym)
 Potadoma pokoensis Pilsbry & Bequaert, 1927: synonym of Potadoma liricincta (E. A. Smith, 1888) (junior synonym)
 Potadoma superba Pilsbry & Bequaert, 1927: synonym of Potadoma ponthiervillensis (Dupuis & Putzeys, 1900) (junior synonym)
 Potadoma tigrinum Connolly, 1938: synonym of Potadoma freethi tigrinum  Connolly, 1938
 Potadoma tornata (Martens, 1892): synonym of Potadoma liricincta (E. A. Smith, 1888)

References

 Martens, E. von. (1901). Eine neue Süsswasserschnecke aus Kamerun. Sitzungsberichte der Gesellschaft Naturforschender Freunde zu Berlin. (1901): 26-27.

External links
 Swainson, W. (1840). A treatise on malacology or shells and shell-fish. London, Longman. viii + 419 pp.
 Clench, W. J. (1929). Some records and descriptions of new fresh-water mollusks from Cameroon. Bulletin of the Museum of Comparative Zoology. 69(6):117–123

Pachychilidae